() is the name given to a currency denominated in  which was issued by Germany in 1918 for use in a part of the eastern areas under German control at that time, the  area.

Denominations

The denominations available were:
  mark;
 1 mark;
 2 marks;
 5 marks;
 20 marks;
 50 marks;
 100 marks;
 1000 marks.

The reverse sides of the  carry a warning against forging banknotes in German, Latvian and Lithuanian.

Aftermath
The  was pegged to the U.S. dollar.

Bibliography
  
 N. Jakimovs and V. Marcilger, The Postal and Monetary History of Latvia 1918–1945, own book, 1991, pp. 14–13 - 14–15.

External links
 German banknotes, a.o. Ostrubels and Ostmarks.

Currencies of Germany
Currencies of Lithuania
German Empire in World War I
Modern obsolete currencies
1918 establishments in Germany
1922 disestablishments
Currencies introduced in 1918